The 2022 Plzeň municipal election was held on 23 and 24 September 2022 as part of the nationwide municipal elections. The result was a narrow victory for Spolu which received highest number of votes but was tied with ANO 2011 by number of seats. After the election ANO 2011 formed coalition with Czech Pirate Party and Mayors and Independents with Roman Zarzycký as the new Mayor. New coalition was to be supported by 2 SPD members of the assembly but after disagreement of Piráti and STAN leadership they were replaced by PRO Plzeň.

Background
Previous election was held in 2018. ANO 2011 has won the popular vote but tied with the Civic Democratic Party by number of seats. Coalition formed after the election was formed on 15 October 2018 consisting ANO 2011, Civic Democratic Party, TOP 09 and Czech Social Democratic Party. Martin Baxa became the new Mayor. On 17 January 2022 Baxa was replaced by Pavel Šindelář as Baxa became Minister of Culture. Šindelář decided to not run for second term. ODS, KDU-ČSL and TOP 09 decided to run under Spolu alliance banner with David Šlouf as electoral leader. Roman Zarzycký will lead ANO 2011.

Opinion polls

Result

References

2022
2022 elections in the Czech Republic